Britain's Strongest Man is an annual strongman event held in the United Kingdom. Competitors qualify for the final through regional heats and the winner is awarded the title of "Britain's Strongest Man". The competition is produced by TWI and serves as a qualifying event for the World's Strongest Man ("WSM") competition, also a TWI production.

History

In a history that has close parallels with that of the World's Strongest Man competition, the BSM competition has had a number of sponsors and, at different times, has had to vie with rival competitions that also claim to produce the strongest man in Britain as their champion. The inaugural competition was in 1979 and was organised by TWI. It was covered by the BBC. The final contest involved the field athletes Geoff Capes and Jim Whitehead, weightlifter Andy Drzewiecki, powerlifter Ray Nobile, Highland Games specialists Bill Anderson and Grant Anderson, wrestler Big Pat Roach, and Tosher Killingback; it was won by Geoff Capes. The contestants were there by invitation. The format continued until 1984. There was then a break of three years, from 1985 through 1988, before the competition returned in 1989. In 1986, there was a "Britain's Most Powerful Man" and, in 1988, a competition was organised by Geoff Capes and David Webster to find a successor to Geoff Capes, called the John Smith's Trial of Strength. The results of these competitions are often deemed to be equivalent to Britain's Strongest Man given the lack of a competition in those years. The IFSA, after its creation in the mid-nineties, managed the event but parted company with TW1 after the completion of the 2004 event. TW1 have managed to have the event televised since the BBC opted out in 2004, with Sky One covering it in 2005 Tim Burrows was the youngest ever winner from Great Britain and Five in 2007 and 2008. The competition is currently sponsored by Met-Rx. As of 2017, Channel 5 currently broadcasts an episode devoted to the Britain's Strongest Man contest as part of its annual World's Strongest Man coverage in late December.

Events
Events for the competition include tyre flips, chain drags, Atlas stones and keg tossing.

Rival and parallel competitions
In 2005 the 'IFSA Strongman British Championship' (or "British Championships (IFSA)") was held in direct competition with the BSM. However, this was short lived, lasting just one year, with the more established BSM gaining better sponsorship (from Met-Rx) and television coverage (Sky One) largely due to its longevity, its qualifying status for World's Strongest Man and also its perception amongst the strongman community as the chief competition. The winner of this breakaway competition, Mark Felix, has since put his energies into competing in the BSM.
A more enduring rival competition is the UK Strongest Man 'Ultimate Strength Challenge', which began in 1992 and still continues today. However, competing in the BSM and the UKSC is not mutually exclusive and competitors are free to compete in both. This event is run by the UKSC - the UK Strength Council, and focuses more on pure strength rather than strength and speed.
Other rival or parallel competitions that should not be confused with the BSM are:
"UK Championship (IFSA)", which only ran for one year in 1997
"Britain's Most Powerful Man", which, although a "rival" in 2007, was last run in 1986, when there was no BSM and its winners are counted in the same list as the winners of the BSM
"British Muscle Power Championship" - this ran from 1986 to 1998 and included some of the biggest names of British strength athletics, including Geoff Capes, Jamie Reeves, Mark Higgins, Forbes Cowan, Gary Taylor and Russ Bradley. However, it was not so much a rival of BSM as an extra competition.

List of champions

Notes

Clash of the Giants
In 2011, an event was organised in Boroughbridge advertised to allow spectators to see "top British strongmen compete to take a step closer towards a place at World's Strongest Man". The event was organised by multiple World's Strongest Man entrant Darren Sadler and the top two places, won by Rob Frampton and Jack McIntosh, received invitations to North Carolina to compete at the 32nd World's Strongest Man. Clash of the Giants was designed to fill the void left by the absence of the Britain's Strongest Man competition last held in 2008, much as the 1988 John Smith's Trial of Strength had been created following the discontinuation of the BSM in 1984. Unlike the BSM, which is the final stage of a knockout competition comprising a number of regional and national rounds, the Clash of the Giants was a singular event. Because there was no regional tiered competition preceding, it there was no prerequisite that the Clash of the Giants have a field of athletes representing each area of Britain and notably all the athletes competing were English. In addition, the three most successful British strength athletes actively competing at the time, namely Hollands, Felix and Shahlaei, had qualified for the WSM via international grand prix events and did not compete.

Championships by country

Repeat champions

See also
List of Strongman Competitions

References
David Horne's World of Grip is the source of the names and placings of the above finalists and champions.

Notes

National strongmen competitions
Competitions in the United Kingdom
1979 establishments in the United Kingdom
Recurring events established in 1979
Annual events in the United Kingdom